The British League was the main motorcycle speedway league in Britain from its formation in 1965 until 1995 when British speedway was restructured. It initially had a single division, with a second division starting in 1968 (which was renamed the New National League in 1975 and subsequently the National League).

The British League was formed in 1965 following the merger of the National League and the Provincial League. Matches were held over a series of races, with two riders from each team taking part in each race. In 1995 it was replaced by the Premier League for two years before the sport was restructured into three tiers with the formation of the Elite League in 1997. The Championship was decided on a league table basis.

Champions

See also
List of United Kingdom Speedway League Champions
List of United Kingdom Speedway League Riders' champions
British League Riders' Championship

References

External links
speedwaygb.co - Official BSPA (British Speedway Promoters Association) Homepage

 
Speedway leagues
Speedway competitions in the United Kingdom